Yukhnevo is a rural locality (a village) in Puyskoye Rural Settlement of Velsky District, Arkhangelsk Oblast, Russia. The population was 67 as of 2014.

Geography 
Yukhnevo is located 55 km north of Velsk (the district's administrative centre) by road. Ignatovka is the nearest rural locality.

References 

Rural localities in Velsky District